Charles Augustus Fallon (March 7, 1881 – June 10, 1960) was an American baseball player. Fallon appeared in one Major League Baseball game as a pinch runner for the New York Highlanders. He batted and threw right-handed.

Fallon was born in New York, New York and died in Kings Park, New York.

External links

1881 births
1960 deaths
New York Highlanders players
Baseball players from New York (state)
Hartford Senators players
Montreal Royals players
Toronto Maple Leafs (International League) players
New Haven Prairie Hens players
Binghamton Bingoes players
Troy Trojans (minor league) players
People from Kings Park, New York
Burials at Calvary Cemetery (Queens)